Pike Ride is a combination of bus routes along Columbia Pike in Northern Virginia, United States. It consists of service operated by the Washington Metropolitan Area Transit Authority (Metrobus) and Arlington Transit (ART), connecting the Pentagon and Pentagon City Washington Metro stations in Arlington County with Annandale in Fairfax County.

The service started in 2003. Route timetables and other useful information were implemented in numerous bus stops along the corridor, printed in both English and Spanish. ART provides cell phone users with an 800 number that is listed at each bus stop to call and obtain bus schedule information.

Routes
The following routes are branded as Pike Ride service:

History
Robert L. May of Barcroft began operating buses along Columbia Pike in 1921, running from downtown Washington over the 14th Street Bridge to Barcroft. Among other additions, he acquired the former Washington, Alexandria and Mount Vernon Railway at foreclosure in 1930 and replaced it with buses in 1932. May incorporated the Alexandria, Barcroft and Washington Transit Company in 1934. This company continued independent operation until February 4, 1973, when WMATA acquired it.

Improvements

Since 2003, some effort has been made to improve service along the corridor. In July 2016, the Arlington County Board approved a Transit Development Plan that includes enhanced bus service along Columbia Pike. There will be 23 enhanced bus stops, with BRT-like amenities like near-level boarding, real-time bus arrival information and off-vehicle fare collection. This proposal, called a Premium Transit Network, has since been delayed until 2019 due to Metro rebuilding efforts. The use of dedicated lanes for the corridor was studied by the country, but were deemed to be challenging and unlikely. The buses could have a distinctive appearance.

References

External links
CommuterPage.com: Pike Ride

Bus transportation in Virginia
Metrobus (Washington, D.C.)
Transportation in Arlington County, Virginia